The Academy of Country Music Award for Entertainer of the Year is the biggest competitive category presented at the Academy of Country Music Awards. The award has been given annually since 1970, and is the final award presented at the ceremony.

During the 52 nomination years, 60 artists have been nominated for the Entertainer of the Year; 27 of these have won, including co-winners and ties. Of these, Garth Brooks has received the most awards, with six awards out of 13 nominations. The two artists who have won more than three times are Alabama with 5 out of 10 nominations and Kenny Chesney with 5 out of 11. The two artists who have won three times are Carrie Underwood with 3 out of 5 nominations, and Brooks & Dunn with 3 out of 12 nominations. George Strait and Reba McEntire have received the most nominations; Strait won 2 out of 14 nominations and McEntire won 1 out of 9 nominations.

Winners and nominees 
In the following tables, the years correspond to the date of the ceremony. Artists are eligible based on their work of the previous calendar year. Entries with a blue ribbon next to the artist's name have won the award; those with a white background are the nominees on the short-list.

Category Records

Wins 
 Male artist with most wins — Garth Brooks (6).
 Female artist with most wins — Carrie Underwood (3).
 Group with most wins — Alabama (5).
 Duo with the most wins — Brooks & Dunn (3).

Nominations 

Male artist with most nominations — George Strait (14).
 Female artist with most nominations — Reba McEntire (9).
 Group with most nominations — Alabama (10).
 Duo with the most nominations — Brooks & Dunn (12).

See also
Country Music Association Award for Entertainer of the Year

References

Academy of Country Music Awards
Awards established in 1970